Oryzalin is an herbicide of the dinitroaniline class.  It acts through the disruption (depolymerization) of microtubules, thus blocking anisotropic growth of plant cells. It can also be used to induce polyploidy in plants as an alternative to colchicine.

References

External links
 

Antiparasitic agents
Nitrobenzenes
Sulfonamides
Preemergent herbicides
Anilines
Microtubule inhibitors